The Old Post Office and Courthouse is a historic courthouse and former post office located at 157 Genesee Street in Auburn, New York. It was built in 1888–1890 and was designed by the Office of the Supervising Architect of the Treasury Department, Mifflin E. Bell, in the Richardsonian Romanesque style. The limestone-and-brick building was expanded in 1913–1914, designed by James M. Elliot, and again in 1937. It serves as a courthouse of the United States District Court for the Northern District of New York. The massive, asymmetrical, -story main block (1888) includes a 3-story tower at the southwest corner, a -story stair tower, and two massive Richardsonian Romanesque–style entrances.

The building was surplussed by the Federal government in the 1980s and acquired by Cayuga County.  It was listed on the National Register of Historic Places in 1991.

See also
National Register of Historic Places listings in Cayuga County, New York

References

External links

Auburn
Courthouses in New York (state)
Government buildings completed in 1890
Buildings and structures in Auburn, New York
Richardsonian Romanesque architecture in New York (state)
National Register of Historic Places in Cayuga County, New York